Elmer Eric MacFadyen (January 9, 1943 – August 17, 2007) was a Canadian politician. He represented Sherwood-Hillsborough in the Legislative Assembly of Prince Edward Island from 1996 to 2007 as a Progressive Conservative member.

MacFadyen was born in Charlottetown, Prince Edward Island, the son of Donald & Annie MacFadyen. He married Judy McAlduff in 1968. MacFadyen was named government house leader in 1996 and was appointed to cabinet as Minister of Community and Cultural Affairs in August 2002. He was defeated in the 2007 general election held in May 2007. MacFadyen suffered a massive heart attack at his home in Charlottetown in August of that year and died in hospital.  He was 64 years old.

MacFadyen is the brother of former Charlottetown Deputy Mayor Stu MacFadyen.

References 
 Canadian Parliamentary Guide, 2000, K. O'Handley

External links 

1943 births
2007 deaths
Members of the Executive Council of Prince Edward Island
People from Charlottetown
Progressive Conservative Party of Prince Edward Island MLAs
21st-century Canadian politicians